The Ritchie County Courthouse in Harrisville, West Virginia is a Neoclassical Revival building designed in 1923 by Clarksburg architects Holmboe & Pogue, and built by Forman & Putnam. It replaced an 1874 courthouse. The courthouse is relatively elaborate compared to its largely rural setting.

It was listed on the National Register of Historic Places in 2004.  It is located in the Harrisville Historic District.

References

Courthouses on the National Register of Historic Places in West Virginia
Neoclassical architecture in West Virginia
Government buildings completed in 1923
Buildings and structures in Ritchie County, West Virginia
County courthouses in West Virginia
Clock towers in West Virginia
National Register of Historic Places in Ritchie County, West Virginia
Historic district contributing properties in West Virginia